The 2009 LA Women's Tennis Championships (also known as the 2009 LA Women's Tennis Championships presented by Herbalife for sponsorship reasons) was a women's tennis tournament played on outdoor hard courts. It was the 36th edition of the LA Women's Tennis Championships, and was part of the Premier Series of the 2009 WTA Tour. It was held at the Home Depot Center in Carson, California, near Los Angeles, United States, from August 3 through August 9, 2009. It was the second women's event on the 2009 US Open Series. Tenth-seeded Flavia Pennetta won the singles title.

Finals

Singles 

 Flavia Pennetta defeated  Samantha Stosur 6–4, 6–3
 It was Pennetta's second title of the year and eighth overall.

Doubles 

 Chuang Chia-jung /  Yan Zi defeated  Maria Kirilenko /  Agnieszka Radwańska 6–0, 4–6, [10–7]

Entrants

Seeds 

 Seedings are based on the rankings of July 27, 2009.
 Maria Bartoli withdrew, so Sabine Lisicki became the No. 17 seed.

Other entrants 
The following players received wildcards into the singles main draw

  Vania King
  CoCo Vandeweghe
  Michelle Larcher de Brito

The following players received entry from the qualifying draw:
  Jill Craybas
  Melanie Oudin
  Chanelle Scheepers
  Michaëlla Krajicek
  Carly Gullickson
  Olga Savchuk
  Anastasia Rodionova
  Kimiko Date-Krumm

The following player received the lucky loser spot:
  Varvara Lepchenko

References

External links 
 Official website
 Tournament draws

LA Women's Tennis Championships
LA Women's Tennis Championships
LA Women's Tennis Championships
LA Women's Tennis